CUB and zona pellucida-like domain-containing protein 1 is a protein that in humans is encoded by the CUZD1 gene.

References

External links

Further reading